Team Braemar is a junior-level synchronized skating team representing Braemar City of Lakes Figure Skating Club, based in Edina, Minnesota. They are the Junior 2009 Midwestern and U.S. champions. The team also earned silver at the Foot of the Lake Junior World Qualifier competition in Fond du Lac, Wisconsin. Team Braemar were the 2007 winner of the Zagreb Snowflakes Trophy, skated in the opening ceremonies of the 1980 Winter Olympics in Lake Placid, New York, and earned third place at the U.S. nationals championship in 2007.

Team Braemar is the name for all teams fielded by Braemar City of Lakes Figure Skating Club fields teams: junior, novice, intermediate, juvenile and beginners'.

References

External links

Team Braemar Home Page

Junior synchronized skating teams
Sports teams in Minnesota
Figure skating in the United States